Hud is a 1963 American Western film directed by Martin Ritt and starring Paul Newman, Melvyn Douglas, Brandon deWilde, and Patricia Neal. It was produced by Ritt and Newman's recently founded company, Salem Productions, and was their first film for Paramount Pictures. Hud was filmed on location on the Texas Panhandle, including Claude, Texas. Its screenplay was by Irving Ravetch and Harriet Frank Jr. and was based on Larry McMurtry's 1961 novel, Horseman, Pass By. The film's title character, Hud Bannon, was a minor character in the original screenplay, but was reworked as the lead role. With its main character an antihero, Hud was later described as a revisionist Western.

The film centers on the ongoing conflict between principled patriarch Homer Bannon and his unscrupulous and arrogant son, Hud, during an outbreak of foot-and-mouth disease putting the family's cattle ranch at risk. Lonnie, Homer's grandson and Hud's nephew, is caught in the conflict and forced to choose which character to follow.

Hud premiered at the Venice International Film Festival, and was a critical and commercial success at its general release. It was nominated for seven Academy Awards, winning three; Patricia Neal won Best Actress, Melvyn Douglas won Best Supporting Actor, and James Wong Howe the Academy Award for Best Black and White Cinematography. Howe's use of contrast to create space and his selection of black-and-white was acclaimed by critics. In later reviews, the film received additional praise. In 2018, the film was included in the National Film Registry by the Library of Congress.

Plot
Hud Bannon (Newman) is ambitious and self-centered, the opposite of his deeply principled rancher father Homer (Douglas). Also living on the Bannon ranch is Hud's teenaged nephew, Lonnie (Brandon deWilde), who looks up to both men, but is most impressed by Hud.  Lonnie and Hud are attracted to the Bannons' housekeeper, Alma (Patricia Neal). Although she is attracted to Hud, Alma keeps her distance because she has been mistreated in the past by men like him.

 
After the sudden, inexplicable death of a cow on the ranch, Homer sends Lonnie to town to bring Hud to the ranch for his opinion.  Lonnie, finding Hud just in time to take the blame for Hud's tryst with a married woman, protests Hud's putting him in a dangerous situation as they return to the ranch, with Hud driving over Alma's flowers as they arrive.  At the dead animal, Hud shoots several buzzards to scare the flock away against his father's protestations that they keep the land clean and shooting them is illegal.  Hud states his immunity to laws that inconvenience him, setting the tone of his overall demeanor.  Hud is annoyed by his father's decision to summon the state veterinarian, and suggests selling the animals to other ranchers before the news spreads; otherwise, government agents will kill all the cattle and destroy everything they have worked for. He blames his father for not realizing that the cheap Mexican cattle were sick before he bought them. Adhering to his principles, Homer ignores Hud's idea and waits for the veterinarian. Upon his arrival, the state veterinarian immediately issues a legally binding state livestock transfer order directing the quarantine of the ranch for a possible foot-and-mouth disease outbreak. This freezes the movement of all livestock to or from the Bannon ranch, while they await the test results.
Aware of the possibility of bankruptcy to the ranch, Homer nevertheless complies.

One night, Hud takes Lonnie out and they prevail in a drunken barroom brawl. Back at the ranch, he reflects on the past (when  Lonnie's father and he did the same thing), revealing his feelings about his brother Norman's death and his father's coldness to him. When they enter the house, Homer confronts Hud, accusing his son of trying to corrupt Lonnie. They argue, with Hud accusing Homer of hypocrisy and resentment of him for Norman's death. Homer replies that his disappointment in Hud began before the accident; Hud cares about no one but himself, and is "not fit to live with". Hurt and angry, Hud retorts "My mama loved me, but she died" as he walks away. When Lonnie tells Homer that he was too harsh and other people act like him, Homer replies that one day he will have to decide for himself what is right and wrong.

After learning from Lonnie that Hud is trying to seize the ranch, Homer confronts Hud.  Infuriated by his eroded inheritance, Hud threatens to have Homer declared legally incompetent so he can take over the ranch.  Homer tells his son he will lose. He admits that he made mistakes raising Hud, and was too hard on him. When Hud accuses him of having a "shape up or ship out" policy, Homer wonders aloud how a man like Hud can be his son and storms off to his room. Hud, drunk, goes outside and tries to rape Alma before Lonnie comes to her aid.

When the herd tests positive for foot-and-mouth disease, the veterinarian orders them to be killed and buried on the ranch under state supervision to keep the disease from spreading.  Hud points out that they could sell some oil leases to keep the ranch profitable, but Homer refuses as he only has pride in cattle, despite his ruinous decision to purchase the Mexican cattle.

The state veterinarian and his assistant pull up to ranch following the killing of most of Homer's cattle, noticing that  two Longhorns are still alive.  The assistant gets his rifle and proceeds to leave the car with the intention of killing them.  Homer stops him and tells him he will take care of them himself, seeing as how he raised them.  The assistant voices his doubts about Homer going through with it, he has no guarantee that will happen.  Then Hud soundly defends his father's word and tells him, "he just said he would."

Alma decides to leave the ranch. After Lonnie drops her off at the bus station, Hud sees her as she is waiting. He apologizes for his drunken assault, but not for his attraction to her, and he would remember her as "the one who got away". Driving back to the ranch, Lonnie sees his grandfather lying on the side of the road after a fall from his horse during a survey of the ranch. Hud pulls up behind Lonnie, and despite their efforts, he dies.

Lonnie is repelled by his uncle's treatment of Homer and Alma and leaves the ranch after his grandfather's funeral, uncertain if he will ever return. When he tells Hud to put his half of their inheritance in the bank, his uncle replies that Lonnie now sees him as Homer did. Hud goes back into the Bannon house alone; as he closes the door, the final fade-out is the window shade's pull-ring swaying.

Cast
 Paul Newman as Hud Bannon, the arrogant, self-centered son of rancher Homer Bannon: To prepare for the role, Newman worked for 10 days on a Texas ranch, sleeping in a bunkhouse. For his Texas accent, he was coached by Bob Hinkle, who coached James Dean for his role as Jett Rink in Giant.
 Melvyn Douglas as Homer Bannon: Hud's father, Lonnie's grandfather, and owner of the Bannon ranch: Although Paramount was doubtful about casting him due to his heart condition, Martin Ritt insisted that he was the right actor for the role.
 Brandon deWilde as Lonnie Bannon, Hud's teenaged nephew who idolizes him: DeWilde, a former child actor, was best known at the time for his award-winning role in Shane.
 Patricia Neal as Alma Brown, the Bannons' housekeeper: Ritt decided to cast Neal (whom he had met at the Actors Studio) when he was impressed by her performance in The Untouchables episode "The Maggie Storm Story". The actress signed for $30,000; although she had third billing and 22 minutes of screen time, the film had a major impact on her career.

 Whit Bissell as Mr. Burris
 Crahan Denton as Jesse
 John Ashley as Hermy
 Val Avery as Jose
 George Petrie as Joe Scanlon
 Curt Conway as Truman Peters
 Sheldon Allman as Mr. Thompson
 Pitt Herbert as Mr. Larker
 Carl Low as Mr. Kirby
 Robert Hinkle as Radio Announcer Frank
 Don Kennedy as Charlie Tucker
 Sharyn Hillyer as Myra
 Yvette Vickers as Lily Peters

Production

Development
After working together on other projects, director Martin Ritt and Paul Newman co-founded Salem Productions and the company made a three-film deal with Paramount Studios. For its first film, Salem hired husband-and-wife scriptwriters Irving Ravetch and Harriet Frank Jr., who worked with Ritt and Newman on The Long, Hot Summer. Ravetch found Larry McMurtry's novel, Horseman, Pass By, in an airport shop during a Dallas stopover and presented the project to Ritt and Newman after reading a description of Hud Bannon. The partners met Ravetch and Frank at their home, approved the project, and the writers adapted the script.

Although McMurtry's novel focuses on Lonnie Bannon, Ravetch and Frank expanded Hud's character to the lead role. Ritt wanted Hud to be an antihero who did not regret his actions at the end of the film. He was changed from Homer's stepson to his son, and the character of Homer's wife was eliminated. Newman and Ritt initially named the project Wild Desire, followed by The Winners, Hud Bannon Against the World, Hud Bannon and finally Hud. Ravetch and Frank accompanied Ritt and Newman through preproduction, casting, and publicity design.

Ritt asked that the housekeeper character (originally Halmea, a black woman) be renamed Alma and played by a white actress, because he thought a relationship between Hud and a black woman would not work. According to Ravetch and Frank, "Neither American Western film nor American society was quite ready for that back then." Although Halmea is assaulted by Hud in the novel, Ravetch and Frank added Lonnie's intervention to "highlight" his significance and keep Hud "human" and not "totally and simplistically evil." To accentuate the scene's violence, Hud's roughness was complemented by the use of shadows, while a camera was attached on Newman's back to create a "man's view angle" while he chased Neal. Film critic Pauline Kael described Neal's performance as "perhaps the first female equivalent of the white-negro."

Cinematographer James Wong Howe shot Hud in black-and-white to "elevate its dramatic propensities." Filmed in Panavision, Howe used high contrast with unbalanced light and dark tones. He highlighted the white ground and clear skies, making the shadows black. Dark tones were "overpowered" by light ones, creating a sense of "infinite space." For faces and structures, Howe used light reflected from the ground. The contrast between the environment and objects silhouetted against the background provides a sense of depth. Ritt's biographer, Carlton Jackson, wrote that in Hud "the scenery becomes a part of the thematic development itself." According to Texas Monthly, "Howe's austere rendition of Texas landscapes [...] remains one of the film's most distinctive pleasures."

Filming
Hud was shot over a four-week period in and around the Texas Panhandle, using the town of Claude as a setting. Location filming began on May 21, 1962, and was finished by the second week of June. Outdoor scenes were filmed at the Goodnight Ranch. To avoid surpassing the shooting schedule due to weather conditions, the cast had to cancel two scenes originally planned for the location that featured people from Claude and Amarillo. The rest of the scenes were shot at the Paramount sound stages in Hollywood beginning in the first week of July. The film was completed on August 1, 1962. The pig-scramble scene, written by dialect coach Bob Hinkle, replaced a softball game in Ravetch and Frank's script; Hinkle played the announcer in the scene. For the filming of the cattle-slaughter scene, the Humane Society was present to monitor the animals' treatment. The herd was sprayed with a substance to make it appear ill, and bungee cords were tied to the cattle's legs. Camera angles were arranged by Ritt and Howe to avoid showing the death of the cattle. When a man was shown shooting, the camera would switch to the cattle; the crew shook the cords, creating an effect of the herd being shot. During location shooting, Newman and deWilde often changed hotel rooms due to female fans following them.

Elmer Bernstein used sparse arrangements for Huds score; in its theme, Bernstein "insinuated" natural sounds with "poignant strings on the guitar." Variety called the theme "vital and noteworthy," "sombre, plaintive and foreboding."

John Ashley had a role, but it was mostly removed during the edit process.

Huds budget was $2.35 million, and Paramount executives were unhappy with the film. They felt it was too dark and were displeased by the black-and-white cinematography and Hud's lack of remorse and unchanged behavior. Although Martin Rackin asked Ritt to change the film's ending, Newman and he decided to keep the original. After Hud was previewed, Paramount considered dropping the project, feeling that it was not "commercial enough," but Ritt flew to New York and convinced the executives to release the film unmodified.
Advertising posters, with Newman in blue jeans in a "suggestive, full-length pose," read: "Paul Newman is 'Hud'! ... the man with the barbed-wire soul."

Release and reception
Hud was acclaimed during its premiere at the 24th Venice International Film Festival. After its general release on May 29, 1963, the film grossed $10 million at the domestic box office, earning $5 million in theatrical rentals. It was the 19th-highest-grossing film of the year. Life called Hud an "arrestingalmost greatmovie", describing Paul Newman's acting as "faultless". An Outlook reviewer wrote that the four main cast members acted "splendidly"; Newman "speaks at times with an unpleasant nasal twang, but is clearly suited to the part." They described Melvyn Douglas' performance as "impeccable", Brandon deWilde's as "[successful] in looking earnest unsure of himself" and praised Patricia Neal's expressiveness. Time called the performances "splendid", and Howe's photography "brings the Texas Panhandle to dusty, sweaty life." The New York Times, in a favorable review, said Ritt's direction had "[a] powerfully realistic style" and called Ravetch and Frank's work "[an] excellent screenplay." The newspaper called Newman's acting "tremendous", Douglas' "magnificent", deWilde's "eloquent of clean, modern youth" and Patricia Neal's "brilliant." The review also praised James Wong Howe's "excellent" camera work and Elmer Bernstein's "poignant" score. Variety called Hud "a near miss"; its screenplay fails to "filter its meaning and theme lucidly through its characters and story", although it called the four leads' performances "excellent."

Through the character of Hud, Ritt and Newman had intended to show the corruption of modern capitalism and the pitfalls of admiring an individual blindly, without observing his character. Critics, however, did not universally echo this view. Lifes review described Hud as "likable, smart, and [with] the potential to measure up to his tough, honorable father" and Saturday Review called him a  "charming, raffish monster". According to Outlook, "Hud Bannon is a mean, unscrupulous man who never has even a momentary twinge of conscience or change of heart"; in the end scene, Hud "[p]ulls down the shade on the world of goodness and decency". Pauline Kael initially described the film as an "anti-Western"; she called it an "anti-American film", which was "so astutely made and yet such a mess that it (was) redeemed by its fundamental dishonesty."

The Los Angeles Times critic John L. Scott felt that the film was "a bewildering, at times brilliant, bitter look at life in the raw". The reviewer described the relation between Hud and Homer and determined that "two hours of this type of conflict can prove distasteful" but he added that the "vivid performances of principals" and "some yeoman work" by Ritt "are definite credits, turning 'Hud' into an absorbing, if troubling, cinematic experience". Scott commented that in the film "Newman gives one of his finest portrayals". Meanwhile, he deemed Douglas's acting "a powerful, wrenching portrayal". He praised Neal's "bawdy humor" that "combines drabness and atractiveness in quite wonderful fashion." and called De Wilde "a good choice for the role". The reviewer celebrated Howe as "long one of the best, with fine photography". The New York Daily News rated "Hud" with four stars,  as the publication consider the movie "a rarity, a realistic film about real people, hard, stubborn cattlemen of Texas, a drama unsentimental and uncompromising in a strained relationship". The piece determined that Ritt "made a picture that has nothing wrong with it" and that it was "storytelling at its best". The performances of Newman, De Wilde, Douglas and Neal were welcomed as "uniform perfection" as the review further added that they "play these strong people as if they had lived them". The column concluded that "Hud" was "a western of a rare variety, modern and effectively dramatic."

The Philadelphia Inquirer wrote that calling the film "a western" would put it "a very specific story into a very general category". Reviewer Henry Murdock felt that "Hud" had "a highly individualistic , arresting approach of its own."  The review expressed that it was "filled with good performances" and that Ritt "can make mood as important as action". Murdock hailed Newman and Douglas's performance as "superb as the antagonists", while he remarked De Wilde's "intuition to the role". However, the review focused on Neal's appearance that the review considered "of such courage and clarity , such understating of Hud's character" That Murdock "wanted to violate all the rules of critics' behaviour by applauding her terrific performance."  Meanwhile, the Chicago Tribune attributed the main character's behavior as "one of the reasons for this pictures' power, in addition to some superior performances, is that provides no easy answers." Newman's interpretation, that treated the role in a "smoldering, shattering fashion" was deemed "powerful". Douglas's appearance was  seen as "the perfect touch of a true professional", while De Wilde's offered "innocence and vulnerability without the slightest trace of mawkishness." The review finished crediting Ritt with "an uncompromising story with economical effectiveness."

The Miami Herald praised the film, as the publication opined that Ritt produced "superb performances out of his first rate cast." Critic Jack Anderson hailed Ravetch and Frank's adaptation that offered "a well balanced script" and "skillfully managed inter-relationship of its characters." Meanwhile, he described Howe's capture of the Texas Panhandle as "spell-binding effectiveness". While Anderson felt that the story was "a depressing one", he opined that it was "so well told and acted that it transcends its emotional murkiness to make it completely fascinating to watch." The Kansas City Star favored Newman's "enormous range and depth". The reviewer felt that Hud was "much like life" as in the end "Nothing is settled, no real victories are won and none of the principals undergoes a major change in character or personality". For the reviewer, Neal showed "wit and allure" and De Wilde appeared "callow, yet wise; eager, yet restrained". The publication attributed its positive reception to Ravetch and Frank's screenplay, as well as to Ritt's interpretation of the material. It described Ritt's direction as "building tansion and then changing step quickly as the fury mounts". For the reviewer, Hud was "enhanced  considerably by the use of black and white film" , while he added that the characters were "so vital" that "color photography might have overstated the general tone".

Although Hud was conceived as an outwardly charming, but morally repugnant character, audiences, especially young people, found him likable, even admirable. Paul Newman said, "We thought [the] last thing people would do was accept Hud as a heroic character ... His amorality just went over [the audience's] head; all they saw was this Western, heroic individual". Martin Ritt later attributed audience interpretation of the character to the counterculture of the 1960s which "changed the values" of the young audiences who saw Hud as a hero.

In 2018, the film was selected for preservation in the United States National Film Registry by the Library of Congress as being "culturally, historically, or aesthetically significant".

Later evaluation in film guides
Leonard Maltin's Movie Guide gave Hud four stars out of four. Maltin called the film "An excellent story of moral degradation, with impeccable performances by all". Steven H. Scheuer's Movies on TV also gave the film four stars out of four; Scheuer called it "a must for movie-drama fans", and said the cast was "superb". In Film and Video Guide Leslie Halliwell gave Hud four stars out of four, calling it "unique". Allmovie gave Hud five stars out of five, calling the film "a warning shot for the Sixties" and saying that its "generational conflict would prove prescient". It praised Howe's cinematography, which gave the film "an authentic Western feel".

Awards and nominations

Preservation
The Academy Film Archive preserved Hud in 2005. In 2018, the film was selected for preservation in the United States National Film Registry by the Library of Congress as being "culturally, historically, or aesthetically significant."

See also
 List of American films of 1963

References

Sources

External links
 
 
 
 
 
 
 Hud at Letterbox DVD

1963 films
1963 Western (genre) films
American black-and-white films
American Western (genre) films
Films scored by Elmer Bernstein
Films about families
Films based on American novels
Films directed by Martin Ritt
Films featuring a Best Actress Academy Award-winning performance
Films featuring a Best Supporting Actor Academy Award-winning performance
Films set in Texas
Films shot in Texas
Films whose cinematographer won the Best Cinematography Academy Award
Neo-Western films
Paramount Pictures films
United States National Film Registry films
1963 drama films
1960s English-language films
1960s American films